Tiny Tony is a Filipino comic book character created by Mars Ravelo and illustrated by Jim Fernandez.

In other media

Television

The 2009 television series Komiks Presents: Tiny Tony stars John Prats.

Collected editions

See also 
Isang Lakas
List of Filipino superheroes

References

External links

Tiny Tony at the International Catalogue of Superheroes
Tiny Tony
Tiny Tony Drama Show

Philippine comics titles
1965 comics debuts
Filipino superheroes
Comics characters introduced in 1965
Fictional scientists in comics
Comics characters with superhuman strength
Fictional Filipino people
Filipino comics characters
Shapeshifter characters in comics